Terry Burns may refer to:

Terence Burns, Baron Burns (born 1944), British economist
Terry Burns (1937–1985), brother of David Bowie

See also
Teri Byrne, fitness competitor